Homafaran Allegiance  is a historical photo that was captured by Abdol-Hussein Partovi on 7 February 1979 at the Alavi School, Ruhollah Khomeini's residence after he returned from exile in France. The photo shows the Homafaran, officers in the Shah's Iranian Air Force, saluting Khomeini (who can be seen in the distance). On 8 February, the photo was published on the front page of the Kayhan daily.

The photo is important in two aspects: first, for its publication days before the Iranian Revolution collapsed the Shah's government, and second, that it is the only known image of this meeting. To avoid detection from the Homafaran, the picture was taken from behind.

Since 2000, the original version of this photo has been available at the Cultural-Art Institution in Tehran.

Reactions
Then-Prime Minister Shapour Bakhtiar claimed that the photo was staged. According to Air Force commander documents and Bakhtiar's speech, Army public relations denied the photo; however,  Ruhollah Khomeini confirmed its authenticity. Partovi was also prosecuted. Bakhtiar's government tried to identify every officer who participated in the meeting, but was not successful.

After the Revolution
Iranian Air force commanders swear their allegiance to Supreme Leader, Ali Khamenei, every 8 February.

See also

 Iranian Revolution
 Fajr decade

Gallery

References

1979 works
1979 in art
Iranian Revolution
Black-and-white photographs
Islamic Republic of Iran Air Force
People of the Iranian Revolution
Ruhollah Khomeini
1970s photographs
1979 in Iran